Prunus guanaiensis is a species of tree in the family Rosaceae. It is native to western South America. Its phenotype suggests close affinity with three other South American species of Prunus; P. debilis, P. littlei and  P. wurdackii.

Distribution and habitat
Prunus guanaiensis occurs in montane forests from Colombia south to Bolivia, between 500 – 2000 m of elevation.

References

guanaiensis
Flora of Bolivia
Flora of Colombia
Flora of Ecuador
Flora of Peru